In Slavic mythology, a vidmak
(
;
;
;
;
;
;
;
)
is a warlock or male witch, the female equivalent (witch) being vedma, but unlike the latter, the vedmak may also possess positive qualities. This role greatly focuses on the Shamanic aspects of Slavic Paganism 

For example, they treat people and animals. On the other hand, they are thought to be people connected to the devil, and are capable of bringing harm by sending illnesses, killing cattle, spoiling a harvest, etc. The word was also used as an insult. 
A vedmak can turn into any animal or any object.

Etymology 
Vedmak stems from Proto-Slavic *vědět ("to know") and Old East Slavic вѣдь ("knowledge; witchcraft", compare the use of the term "cunning" in English folklore).

The Witcher 
Under the influence of The Witcher fantasy saga by Andrzej Sapkowski, the term vedmak is sometimes also rendered as "witcher" in English in certain contexts. The word used for "witcher" in the original Polish version of the novels, "wiedźmin", was coined by Sapkowski himself as a neologism, while the word "wiedźmak" (cognate of "vedmak") is used in the books only as a derogatory term for witchers. "Ведьмак" is also the word used to translate "wiedźmin" in the Russian translation of the books.

See also
Witch (etymology)
European witchcraft
Slavic mythology
Krsnik (vampire hunter)
Shamanism

References

Slavic legendary creatures
Ukrainian mythology
Russian mythology
Shapeshifting
European witchcraft